Too Much Fun! is a studio album by the psychedelic folk band the Holy Modal Rounders. It was released in 1999 through Rounder Records. It was the band's first album in more than two decades.

Critical reception
Salon wrote that "essential to the fun of Too Much Fun! are the lack of second takes and the healthy helping of tomfoolery that disguises—or supplants—lyrics forgotten or never learned in the first place."

Track listing

Personnel 

The Holy Modal Rounders
Dave Reisch – bass guitar, vocals
Don Rooke – slide guitar
Peter Stampfel – fiddle, banjo, guitar, mandolin, vocals, production
Steve Weber – guitar, vocals

Additional musicians and production
David B. Greenberger – design
Frazier Mohawk – production
Dr. Toby Mountain – mastering
Phil Sheridan – engineering, mastering
Betsy Wollheim – photography
Jeff Wolpert – engineering

References 

1999 albums
Rounder Records albums
The Holy Modal Rounders albums